Brezovec is a village in northern Croatia, part of the Sveti Martin na Muri municipality within Međimurje County.

History

Brezovec is first time mentioned in charter issued in year 1478 as Brezowecz.

Geography

Brezovec is located in part of Međimurje called Gornje Međimurje. Village is about 20 kilometres northwest from Čakovec, and some 110 kilometres north of Zagreb.
Settlement is situated in the alluvial plane of river Mur, on rivers right bank.

Brezovec had a population of 197 in 2011 census.

References

Populated places in Međimurje County